The Pakistan Polo Association (PPA) is the governing body of polo in Pakistan to promote and organise polo in Pakistan. The Association was formed in 1947 as successor of the Indian Polo Association. The Association is based in Islamabad.

It is affiliated with Federation of International Polo and Pakistan Sports Board.

PPA organizes various levels of Polo in Pakistan mainly 4 goals, 8 goals, and a highest up to 14 goals. Mainly PPA tournaments are held in three major cities of Pakistan : Islamabad, Rawalpindi and Lahore. The Lahore Polo Club (LPC), Lahore Garrison Polo Ground (LGPG), Jinnah Polo Fields (JPF) are host to 10-14 goal Polo while The Rawalpindi Garrison Polo Grounds (RGPG) and Islamabad Club Polo Ground (ICPG) hosts 4-8 goal Polo.
PPA also administers The Pakistan Polo Team. The Pakistan Polo Team has represented Pakistan in 4 World Polo Championships. Their first participation came in VII FIP World Polo Championship in Chantilly, France while their last representation came at the XII FIP World Polo Championship, 2022 held at The Palm Beaches, Florida, USA. Pakistan falls in Zone E of Federation of Indernational Polo along with Egypt, India, Iran, Jordan, Kenya, Kuwait, Lebanon, Morocco, Nigeria, Oman, Qatar, Saudi Arabia, South Africa, Tunisia, Uganda, United Arab Emirates (UAE), Zimbabwe and Uzbekistan. Overall Pakistan lies in the top 10 Polo playing countries.
The Pakistan Team consists of Hamza Mawaz Khan (Captain), Raja Temur Nadeem, Raja Jalal Arsalan, Ahmed Ali Tiwana, Bilal Haye, Raja Mekayial Sami, Raja Samiullah, Brig(r) Bader-uz-Zaman (Team Coach) and Lt Col Ayaz Ahmed (Assistant Team Coach).

See also
Shandur - The highest polo ground on Earth

References

External links
 Official Website

 

Polo in Pakistan
Sports governing bodies in Pakistan
Polo governing bodies
Sports organizations established in 1947
1947 establishments in Pakistan